Bushfires were mostly active between September 2011 to March 2012 and caused most damage in the state of Western Australia, particularly in the South West. The state had been prepared and had expected an increased risk of bushfire following heavy spring rains as a result of a La Nina weather pattern.

September 
Northern Territory
Large fires swept through the Barkly Tableland and Victoria River districts, destroying large tracts of grazing land.

Western Australia
During the Kimberley Ultramarathon on 2 September, a bushfire raced through the course, engulfing a group of five participants at El Questro Station. Two men escaped the flames, suffering severe burns but the two females were trapped, each suffering critical injuries. Thirty grass fires were burning in Kimberley at the same time. It has since been discovered that Kimberley locals were lighting fires before and on the day of the race

October 
NSW
A bushfire at Katoomba and the Blue Mountains on 24 October caused some houses and a school to be evacuated, over 100 fire-fighters and three aircraft responding to contain the blaze. Some minor property damage occurred but no homes were lost in the blaze.

November 
WA
A fire broke out near Margaret River in the South West region on 23 November.
The fire soon swept over the town causing hundreds of people from Prevelly, Gnarabup and the town outskirts to be evacuated to the beach. By the following day dozens of homes had been lost to the fire, including historic Wallcliffe House. The premier, Colin Barnett, declared Margaret River a Natural Disaster Zone and promised a full inquiry as to how the fire started.
The fire was controlled by 26 November after burning through  of land and leaving a total of 39 homes destroyed and another 14 damaged, but there were no deaths.

December 
WA

A large portion of Giralia Station was burnt out with the firecoming close to the homestead before being extinguished. Yanrey and Koordarrie Stations were also threatened by the blaze.

January
QLD
Moreton Island suffered a grass fire that burnt out  of the island vegetation and came within  of the small community of Cowan which was protected by backburning. The fire started on 4 January and was expected to burn for weeks.

SA

VIC
A fire broke out in the Grampians on 4 January and was thought to have been started by lightning. 150 fire-fighters battled the blaze along with water bombing aircraft. Over  of bushland was burnt in the blaze.

WA
More fires were also ignited in the Kearney State forest, near Nannup, resulting from lightning strikes.

Other fires that broke out late in January in Wooroloo and Chittering were both under control by 30 January.

February
WA
The town of Northcliffe was menaced by a bushfire that came within  of the townsite on 22 February. Smoke haze from the fire effected the south west coast of the state. The fire had been ignited by lightning on 8 February and had burnt out over  14 February and was expected to burn over  before being contained.

March
WA
A fire broke out north of Nannup and was brought under control by 14 March. 113 personnel, 13 trucks and 4 earthmovers were used in containing the blaze.
The suburb of Koondoola was struck by a fire that threatened homes on 28 March. The fire that started under suspicious circumstances burnt out 45ha of bushland and required 55 fire-fighters and waterbombers to bring it under control.

References 

2011
2011 wildfires
2012 wildfires
Bushfire
Bushfire
Bush 
Bush